NGC 3841 is an elliptical or lenticular galaxy located about 300 million light-years away in the constellation Leo. It was discovered by astronomer John Herschel on March 25, 1827 is a member of the Leo Cluster.

On November 17, 2006 a type Ia supernova designated as SN 2006oq was found near NGC 3841. However it was not associated with the galaxy.

See also
 List of NGC objects (3001–4000)

References

External links
 

3841
36469
Elliptical galaxies
Leo (constellation)
Leo Cluster
Lenticular galaxies
Astronomical objects discovered in 1827